Borbash is a village in Nookat District of Osh Region of Kyrgyzstan. It is part of the Bel rural community (ayyl aymagy). Its population was 6,931 in 2021.

Population

References

Populated places in Osh Region